Harmony Row is the third studio album by Scottish musician Jack Bruce, originally released in July 1971.

The album takes its title from a tenement street in Glasgow, near where Bruce grew up. The street, since demolished, was famous as the largest unbroken houserow in Europe, stretching for over a mile. The album's cover photo was taken near the Harmony Row tenement in Govan.

Although since cited by Bruce as his favourite solo album, Harmony Row did not chart upon its release. The album would be his last solo effort for over three years, as Bruce would join the power trio West, Bruce and Laing (with whom he would record three albums) in early 1972. The song "The Consul at Sunset", which was inspired by the Malcolm Lowry novel Under the Volcano, was released as a single in 1971 (Polydor 2058–153, b/w "A Letter of Thanks").

On its release, Tony Palmer wrote in the London Observer:
The musicality is polished and exact. The spontaneity of the performance suffers a little, but that is a small price to pay for the skill of the recording. The music flows precisely out of the nuances of the words; their meanings inexplicably linked with the kind of sound produced. It’s almost impossible to imagine the songs being performed in any other way by any other group of musicians.

Track listing
All lyrics composed by Peter Brown, music composed by Jack Bruce.
"Can You Follow?" – 1:32
"Escape to the Royal Wood (On Ice)" – 3:44
"You Burned the Tables on Me" – 3:49
"There's a Forest" – 1:44
"Morning Story" – 4:55
"Folk Song" – 4:20
"Smiles and Grins" – 6:05
"Post War" – 4:20
"A Letter of Thanks" – 2:54
"Victoria Sage" – 5:02
"The Consul at Sunset" – 4:14

2003 CD bonus tracks
"Green Hills" (instrumental version of "Can You Follow?") – 2:16
"You Burned the Tables on Me" (remix including electric piano) – 4:10
"There's a Forest" (first take) – 2:11
"Escape to the Royal Wood (On Ice)" (instrumental demo version) – 4:01
"Can You Follow?" (first take) – 1:32

Personnel
Jack Bruce – vocals, basses, acoustic piano, organ, cellos, harmonica, production, arrangements
Chris Spedding – guitars
John Marshall – drums
Technical
Andy Johns – engineer (track 13)
Barry Ainsworth – engineer (all other selections)

Track No. 13 recorded at Morgan Studios, London, 6 October 1969.

All other tracks recorded at Command Studios, London, mid- to late January 1971.

References

External links
 

Jack Bruce albums
1971 albums
Atco Records albums
Polydor Records albums
Albums produced by Jack Bruce